Loma Grande is a district of the Cordillera Department, Paraguay.

External links
Official page